Helen Keller in Her Story (also known as The Unconquered) is an American biographical documentary about Helen Keller made in 1954.

It won the Academy Award for Best Documentary Feature in 1955.  It starred Helen Keller and used newsreel footage of her travels and visits with Dwight Eisenhower, Martha Graham, and others, as well as newly photographed material of her at home.  The film was produced and directed by Nancy Hamilton and narrated by her partner, actress Katharine Cornell, and was shot mostly in Pittsburgh.

The Academy Film Archive preserved Helen Keller in Her Story in 2006. The premiere took place on 15 June 1954. The film was released under the title Helen Keller in Her Story.

Plot
Helen Keller is a woman in her seventies who have been both deaf and blind since she was 19 months old, but that did not keep her from learning how to read, write, or talk (though she was never able to talk as clearly as she wished she was able to), or even from earning a college degree at the age of 24. The film provides an overview of her life up until the time it was made, and then shows what her daily life is like in 1954. With the assistance of her companion Polly Thompson (Anne Sullivan having died in 1936), Helen travels the world giving speeches and advocating for the disabled, responds to the large amounts of mail she receives, visits with notable figures, listens to the radio...

See also

List of films featuring the deaf and hard of hearing

References

External links

Helen Keller in Her Story at Phoenix Learning Group

1954 films
American documentary films
Black-and-white documentary films
Best Documentary Feature Academy Award winners
1954 documentary films
Documentary films about blind people
American Sign Language films
Films shot in Pennsylvania
Documentary films about deaf people
American black-and-white films
1950s English-language films
1950s American films